A general election was held in the U.S. state of Wyoming on Tuesday, November 6, 1906. All of the state's executive officers—the Governor, Secretary of State, Auditor, Treasurer, and Superintendent of Public Instruction—were up for election. Republicans held onto all statewide offices by landslide margins.

Governor

Incumbent Republican Governor DeForest Richards ran for re-election to a second term, and was renominated at the Republican convention. In the general election, he faced Cody Mayor George T. Beck, whom he defeated in a landslide to win a second term. However, several months into Richards's term, he died in office, elevating Secretary of State Fenimore Chatterton to the governorship and triggering a special election in 1904.

Secretary of State
Incumbent Republican Secretary of State Fenimore Chatterton, who briefly served as acting Governor following DeForest Richards's death, declined to run for re-election. Former Cheyenne Mayor William R. Schnitger, was nominated by the Republican convention for Secretary of State unanimously after he was not selected as the nominee for State Treasurer. At the Democratic convention, current Cheyenne Mayor Daniel W. Gill received the party's nomination. In the general election, Schnitger defeated Gill overwhelmingly.

General election

Results

Auditor
Incumbent Republican State Auditor LeRoy Grant ran for re-election to a third term. He was renominated by the Republican convention and faced Albany County Clerk Thomas J. Dayton, the Democratic nominee, in the general election. Grant was re-elected in a landslide.

General election

Results

Treasurer
Incumbent Republican Treasurer William C. Irvine was barred from seeking a second consecutive term due to term limits. At the Republican convention, Edward Gillette, a railroad superintendent and a former civil engineer, was nominated as Irvine's replacement. In the general election, Gillette faced former State Representative James M. Lobban, the Democratic nominee. Gillette defeated Lobban in a landslide.

General election

Results

Superintendent of Public Instruction
Incumbent Republican Superintendent Thomas T. Tynan ran for re-election to a third term, but was defeated for renomination at the Republican convention by Converse County Clerk Archibald D. Cook. In the general election, he faced Democratic nominee May Hamilton, whom he defeated in a landslide.

General election

Results

References

 
Wyoming